The 2009–10 Sevilla FC season is the club's ninth consecutive season in La Liga. Manolo Jiménez was the team coach until 24 March 2010. On 19 May 2010, Sevilla won the Copa del Rey for the fifth time.

Trophies balance

Competitive balance

Summer transfers

In

Out

Loan return

Loan out

Winter transfers

Loan in

Loan out

Youth system
Players called during season from Sevilla Atlético and Sevilla C.

Squad

Long-term injuries
On 1 January 2010, Sevilla's medical services detected some cardiac pathology in Sergio Sánchez's heart and they recommended to him to stop his activity with the team.

CAN 2010 called players

Players' statistics

Liga BBVA 
Updated to 4 April 2010

Match results
All times are in GMT

Pre-season

Friendly matches

2009 Peace Cup

55th Ramón de Carranza Trophy

2nd Antonio Puerta Trophy

La Liga

With Antonio Álvarez

UEFA Champions League

Group stage

Knockout phase

Round of 16

Copa del Rey

Matches

Round of 32

Sevilla won 9–3 on aggregate.

Round of 16

Sevilla 2–2 Barcelona on aggregate. Sevilla won on away goals.

Quarter-finals

Sevilla won 3–1 on aggregate.

Semi-finals

Sevilla won 2–1 on aggregate.

Final

Others

Jiménez, sacked during the season 
During 23 March's midnight, Sevilla's directive accorded to sack Manolo Jiménez after the draw obtained against Xerez, as Ramón Rodríguez Verdejo (also known as Monchi) assured to press.

Among the most significant causes include:

 The aggregate defeat playing in Round of 16 in Champions League against CSKA Moscow.
 The number of 3 points out of 15 between matchdays 24 and 28.
 The image given by the players from the 12th matchday against Málaga (on 28 November 2009).
 The loss of a style of play that took the team under the leadership of another managers (mainly between 2005–2007).
 The constants injuries suffered by important players such as Luís Fabiano, Jesús Navas or Diego Capel.
 The dialectical clash between Jiménez and Ramón Orellana (Sevilla FC's physical preparer) during a training season in January.

The directive was searching a new team manager for the last part of the season in foreign countries, but Antonio Álvarez will lead the team from 24 March to the end of the season. On the directive's search, Luis Aragonés and Laurent Blanc had many chances to become the new manager of Sevilla, but for the disagreement with the contract offered by José María del Nido, none of them had taken the job except Álvarez.

References
1: UEFA doesn't allow the incorporation of sponsors' names in the stadia's names.

2: Neutral venue.

3: The team that wins this variable will be qualified ahead of another with the same points but lost on goal average. If the goal average is drawn between two or more teams and, at the end of the season these teams have the same points, the overall Liga BBVA's goal average prevails over this goal average.

4: Only if the Copa del Rey winners and runners-up end the season in Champions or Europa League positions.

External links
 Sevilla F.C. season 2009–10 at ESPN

2009-10 Sevilla FC season
Spanish football clubs 2009–10 season